The 2003–04 Scottish Football League First Division was won by Inverness Caledonian Thistle who were promoted to the Scottish Premier League. Ayr United and Brechin City were relegated to the Second Division.

League table

Top scorers

Attendances

The average attendances for Scottish First Division clubs for season 2003/04 are shown below:

Scottish First Division seasons
1
2
Scot